Robert E. Keighron (born December 3, 1980) is an American media personality and radio broadcaster. He was a Roman Catholic priest in the Diocese of Brooklyn before his laicization for personal reasons in 2014. He is best known from his appearances on The Catholic Guy Show with Lino Rulli, a radio show airing on Sirius XM, from 2008–2014. He is also known for periodic appearances with Chris Russo on various radio platforms.

Background
Keighron was born in Queens, New York and graduated from Archbishop Molloy High School in 1998. Keighron then attended St. John's University in New York, where he graduated with a degree in philosophy in 2002. Keighron lived at the Pontifical North American College while he studied in Rome for a Bachelor of Sacred Theology degree. Keighron was then installed as parochial vicar of St. Helen Roman Catholic Church in Howard Beach, Queens. He also served as president of St. Helen Roman Catholic School. In November 2012, he took up residence at the rectory of St. Joseph's Roman Catholic Church in Astoria, Queens in order to devote himself full-time to The Catholic Guy.

Broadcasting career
Keighron's radio career began in 2003 while attending the Pontifical North American College where he was a regular contributor to Mike and the Mad Dog, a New York City-based sports radio show hosted by Chris Russo. He was known as "Rob From The Vatican" and discussed sports predictions. Following his ordination, he remained in Rome and frequently celebrated Mass on Vatican Radio. Keighron went on to host a weekly sports television series that aired on the Diocese of Brooklyn's New Evangelization Television just prior to his full venture into Catholic radio.

In August 2008, Keighron's broadcasting talent was recognized on an international platform when he appeared as a guest on The Catholic Guy Show  with Lino Rulli for a segment focusing on priests from various parts of the country. Following the appearance, Keighron became a frequent guest on the show with in-studio appearances each week. He was chosen to co-host alongside Rulli, as well as co-producer, in September 2011.

On October 10, 2013 Keighron announced his departure as co-host of The Catholic Guy Show; his final full-time show was October 25. He indicated that he loved doing the show, and plans for future show appearances during his discernment.

On June 19, 2014 Keighron made his final appearance on The Catholic Guy Show, announcing he would be leaving active ministry in the priesthood. His final television appearance occurred three days following the announcement, when he returned to New Evangelization Television as a guest host on In The Arena. Following his departure from the priesthood, Keighron continued to make periodic appearances on The Catholic Guy, often in character, until 2015.

On June 20, 2019, five years following his final appearance on radio, Keighron appeared on Sirius XM's Mad Dog Sports Radio, where he provided an update on his life and announced his marriage.

See also
The Catholic Guy Show
Lino Rulli
The Catholic Channel

References

External links

1980 births
Living people
American radio personalities
American Roman Catholic priests
Archbishop Molloy High School alumni
People from Queens, New York
Pontifical North American College alumni
St. John's University (New York City) alumni
Catholics from New York (state)